Paul Carafotes (born March 23, 1959) is an American actor, known for playing Harold Dyer in the prime-time television drama Knots Landing. He has starred in films, television, commercials, and on stage.

Early life

Carafotes was born into an American Greek family and raised in Somerville, Massachusetts. He graduated from Somerville High School.

Career
Carafotes began his professional career at the age of 20 in the 20th Century Fox film Headin' for Broadway.  In it, he portrayed Ralph Morelli, a talented and soulful street kid from Philadelphia in a performance that Variety called "amazing." He followed that performance with another starring role as a partially deaf football player in the drama "Choices" in which Demi Moore debuted on the screen as his girlfriend. He then appeared in the film All the Right Moves as Vinnie Salvucci, teammate and friend of Stef Djordjevic, played by Tom Cruise.

Carafotes won an L.A. Drama Critics Award for writing the play "Beyond the Ring", in which he also starred and was nominated for best actor. He has won multiple awards including the audience award at the Beverly Hills Film Festival for writing, producing and directing the supernatural fantasy short film, "Club Soda". In 2006 Carafotes wrote, directed and produced the short film, Club Soda, edited into Stories USA. In 2010, Carafotes returned to acting in the Emmy award-winning series Damages.

Carafotes, inspired after the birth of his son Charlie, began writing a series of children's books entitled, "The Adventures of Charlie Bubbles!" The series includes a coloring book and CD of songs that complement the storybooks.

Film credits
Headin' for Broadway (1980) as Ralph Morelli
Choices (1981) as John Carluccio
All the Right Moves (1983) as Vinnie
Clan of the Cave Bear (1986) as Brug
The Ladies Club (1986) as Eddie
Blind Date (1987) as Disco Dancer
Journey to the Center of the Earth (1989) as Richard
Italian Movie (1993) as Phillipo
Fight Club (1999) as Salvador the bartender
Scriptfellas (1999) as Barry Goldberg
Lonely Hearts (2006) as Detective Paco
Club Soda (2006) director, writer, producer
American Breakdown (2008) director
@urFRENZ (2010) as Terry
Mind Hunter (2019) as Rod

Personal life 
In 2019, Carafotes alleged that he was the mystery man that Demi Moore slept with the night before her marriage to Freddy Moore in 1981, as detailed in her memoir Inside Out. Carafotes claimed that the two met during an audition for the 1981 film Choices and the two carried on a month long affair.

References

External links
 
www.carafotes.com

1959 births
American male film actors
American male television actors
American people of Greek descent
Living people
Male actors from Massachusetts
People from Somerville, Massachusetts